The Methodist Episcopal Church, also known as the Methodist Episcopal Church of Hibernia, is a historic church built in 1869 and located at 419 Green Pond Road in the Hibernia section of Rockaway Township, Morris County, New Jersey. It was added to the National Register of Historic Places on July 14, 2011, for its significance in architecture and industry. Since 1970, the building has been used as a branch of the Rockaway Township Free Public Library.

History
Hibernia was home to the workers of the nearby Hibernia mines. Using funds from the iron mining companies, the New Jersey Mining Company built the church in 1869 using Carpenter Gothic architectural style, an adoptation of Gothic Revival architecture using simpler materials. In 1953, the property was sold to the Holy Trinity Lutheran Church. In 1969, it was sold to the Rockaway Township Lions Club, who in turn sold it for a nominal $1 to be used as a public library.

See also
National Register of Historic Places listings in Morris County, New Jersey
List of Methodist churches in the United States

References

External links
 
 

Rockaway Township, New Jersey
National Register of Historic Places in Morris County, New Jersey
Churches on the National Register of Historic Places in New Jersey
New Jersey Register of Historic Places
Churches in Morris County, New Jersey
United Methodist churches in New Jersey
Churches completed in 1869
Carpenter Gothic church buildings in New Jersey